Gorgabad (also Romanized as Gorgābād) is a village in Gavork-e Sardasht Rural District, in the Central District of Sardasht County, West Azerbaijan Province, Iran. At the 2006 census, its population was 22, in 4 families.

References 

Populated places in Sardasht County